There exists a number of canals in Canada that are used as aqueducts, diversionary channels for power stations, and for shippings.

Natural canals
A natural canal exists between the Magaguadavic River and Lake Utopia outside St. George, New Brunswick.

Shipping canals

Active

Abandoned

Parts of the Rouge River in Markham, Ontario were being planned by William Berczy in the 1790s as a navigation route between Lake Simcoe and Lake Ontario via Holland River but did not progress beyond clearing of 24 miles along the route.

Other types of canals

Notes

References

 
Canada
Canals
Canals
Canals